Bølandet may refer to:

 Bølandet, Surnadal – a village in Surnadal municipality in Møre og Romsdal, Norway.
 Bølandet – a former name of Leinøy in Herøy municipality in Møre og Romsdal, Norway.